ConsumerAffairs is an American customer review  and consumer news platform that provides information for purchasing decisions around major life changes or milestones.  The company's business-facing division provides SaaS that allows brands to manage and analyze review data to improve their products and customer service. ConsumerAffairs was founded in 1998 by Jim Hood. The company has been headquartered in  Tulsa, Oklahoma since 2010 and also has offices in Austin, Texas, the Philippines, and Argentina. It is not a government organization or a non-profit organization. The current CEO is Zac Carman.

History

The company was founded in 1998 by Jim Hood, an Associated Press executive, editor and reporter, as an easier way of collecting consumer opinions.

In 2010, the company was purchased by Zac Carman as an "opportunity to turn customer complaints into an opportunity for brands." They moved to Tulsa, OK in 2010.

In 2015, the company had a $1.1 million renovation of the Petroleum Building in the Oil Capital Historic District. The renovation was to increase their employee base from 120 to 220.

Criticism

In October 21, 2014, Truth in Advertising published "Who is ConsumerAffairs.com Really Advocating For?" In the article, Unbeatablesale.com complained to the Electronic Retailing Self-Regulation Program, a division of the Better Business Bureaus and National Advertising Review Council, that ConsumerAffairs "creates biased and negative portrayals of companies that don't pay for its service called ConsumerAffairs for Brands." The service collects reviews from customers and gives brands an opportunity to respond. The ERSP "determined that ConsumerAffairs did not adequately disclose its paid affiliation with company members on its website and recommended it do it in a more clear and conspicuous manner." After reviewing ERSP's recommendations, a banner disclosing paid affiliation or non-paying affiliation was added to the ConsumerAffairs website. Of the 115 paying companies, 80% had a 3.5 star or higher rating.

See also
Better Business Bureau
Consumer Reports
Reputation management

References

External links
 

Consumer organizations in the United States
Online companies of the United States
Organizations established in 1998